New Hope is an unincorporated community in Early County, in the U.S. state of Georgia.

History
The first permanent settlement at New Hope was made ca. 1860. The post office at New Hope was called "Fitzhugh". This post office was in operation from 1898 until 1902.

References

Unincorporated communities in Early County, Georgia
Unincorporated communities in Georgia (U.S. state)